Manja is a small town in Karbi Anglong district of Assam state of India. Manja is situated on bank of river Chomna (Yamuna) Diphu roi It is surrounded with beautiful blue hills.

Tourism
Langvoku waterfall is 10km away from the town.

Transport
Manja is the starting point of NH 329A. NH29 pass through it and it connects the other important places. The nearest airport is Dimapur airport which is 40 km away and the nearest railway station is Diphu railway station which is 16km away. The town is well connected to other important places by Bus service.

Education institutions

Colleges 
 Don Bosco Junior College
 Manja Junior College 
Oxford model English school

Schools 
Assamese high School
Baptist English School
Jari Teron English School
Little Flower School
LP Hindi Schools
Manja High School
Nightingale English School
Oxford Model English School
South Point English School

Computer Institute 
 CCERT, Manja
 The Next Generation Computech Institute

Health infrastructure

Hospital
 Manja CHC

References

Villages in Karbi Anglong district